The following is a list of hospitals in Tajikistan that includes the name, location and references.   Tajikistan government sources indicate that there were 325 hospitals in Tajikistan in 1986.  By 2007, the number of hospitals had grown to 426, according to the World Health Organization.

Notable hospitals

See also
 Health in Tajikistan
 Districts of Tajikistan
 Regions of Tajikistan
 Avicenna Tajik State Medical University

References

 List of hospitals in Tajikistan
Tajikistan
Hospitals
Tajikistan